The Radbuza is a river in the Czech Republic, the right source river of the Berounka. Its source is situated at the foot of Lysá mountain (869 metres) near the village of Závist, near Domažlice. It passes through the villages and towns of Rybník, Smolov, Bělá nad Radbuzou, Horšovský Týn, Staňkov, Holýšov, Stod, Chotěšov, Zbůch and Dobřany before joining the Mže in Plzeň, and as the Berounka eventually reaching the Vltava at Prague.

Its major tributaries are the Zubřina, Merklinka and Úhlava.

Gallery of the Radbuza

References 

Rivers of the Plzeň Region